O'Shaughnessy's chameleon (Calumma oshaughnessyi) is a species of chameleon, a lizard in the family Chamaeleonidae. The species is endemic to Madagascar. It was named after the British poet and herpetologist Arthur O'Shaughnessy.

Distribution and habitat
O'Shaughnessy's chameleon has a geographic range of about 18,000 square kilometers (6,950 square miles) throughout the southeastern portion of the central highlands of Madagascar. Its distribution extends from Tsinjoarivo, Ambatolampy in the north to Andohahela National Park in the south. The species is highly dependent on intact, humid forest as its habitat, living in lower densities on selectively logged territories.

Description
O'Shaughnessy's chameleon, being closely related to Parson's chameleon, is similar in shape and color but slightly smaller. Albert Günther, the first to scientifically describe the species, stated that the type specimen is a male measuring 15.5 inches (39.4 cm) in total length, including its tail which is 9 inches (22.9 cm) long. It is mostly brownish gray, with a darker throat and jaw. Although lacking horns, the male of the species has a short, bony structure on the snout. The female does not have this structure.

Behavior
During a 1997 study, researchers discovered that adult O'Shaughnessy's chameleons are most active in the morning and the evening.

Conservation and threats
Although in some places common, O'Shaughnessy's chameleon is severely threatened. Its populations are declining and fragmented, and the species is ranked as vulnerable by the International Union for Conservation of Nature. Although reports of illegal trade in the species do exist, its primary threat is habitat loss, such as logging and deforestation. While significant populations do exist in protected areas, further loss of inhabitable terrain could fragment and isolate these communities.

References

Calumma
Endemic fauna of Madagascar
Reptiles described in 1881
Taxa named by Albert Günther